Bokermannohyla alvarengai is a species of frogs in the family Hylidae. And it belongs to class amphibia.

Distribution and status
It is endemic to Brazil. Its natural habitats are subtropical or tropical high-altitude grassland, rivers, and rocky areas. It is threatened by habitat loss.

Temperature regulation
Bokermannohyla alvarengai is able to lighten its skin colour when hot (and darken when cold), making the skin reflect more heat and so avoid overheating.

References

alvarengai
Endemic fauna of Brazil
Amphibians described in 1956
Taxonomy articles created by Polbot